Political control of Ohio has oscillated between the two major parties. Republicans outnumber Democrats in Ohio government. The governor, Mike DeWine, is a Republican, as are all other non-judicial statewide elected officials: Lieutenant Governor of Ohio Jon A. Husted, Ohio Attorney General Dave Yost, Ohio State Auditor Keith Faber, Ohio Secretary of State Frank LaRose and Ohio State Treasurer Robert Sprague.

In the Ohio State Senate, the Republicans have firm control (24-9), and in the Ohio House of Representatives the Republicans control the delegation (61-38), and they have generally held the legislature since the latter half of the 20th century. The Ohio Congressional Delegation is mostly Republican as well; 10 representatives are Republicans while five are Democrats. One U.S. senator, J. D. Vance, is a Republican, while the other, Sherrod Brown, is a Democrat. 

The mayors of most of the 10 largest cities in the state (Columbus, Cleveland, Cincinnati, Toledo, Akron, Dayton, Youngstown, Canton, Parma, Lorain) are Democrats. The Republicans are strongest in the rural Northwest, the affluent Cincinnati and Columbus suburbs, and have made gains in Appalachian Southeast Ohio and the industrial, working-class Northeast in the 21st century. The Democrats rely on the state's major cities, and have made gains in educated suburban areas in recent years.

The state was strongly Republican from the party's inception, as it voted Republican in every election from 1856 to 1908. The northern Union-aligned part of the state kept the state Republican, and consistently narrowed edged out the Democratic and Appalachia-influenced southern Ohio. Since 1896, however, Ohio has voted for the winning candidate, except for Franklin D Roosevelt in 1944, John F Kennedy in 1960, and Joe Biden in 2020. This was due to Democratic gains in the northeastern part of the state. The state has not backed a losing candidate in consecutive elections since 1848. Due to a close split in party registration, it has been key battleground state. No Republican has ever been elected president without winning Ohio. In 2004, Ohio was the tipping point state, as Bush won the state with 51% of the vote, giving him its 20 electoral votes and the margin he needed in the Electoral College for re-election. The state was closely contested in 2008 and 2012, with Barack Obama winning narrowly on both occasions. Ohio has been a bellwether state in presidential elections.

Since 2016, Ohio's bellwether status has been questioned given that Donald Trump won it by 8 points, the largest margin for each party since 1988, and then won the state by a similar margin in 2020 despite losing nationwide.

Additionally, Ohio's presidential electoral vote total has been declining for decades. Ohio lost two electoral votes after the results of the 2010 United States Census, leaving it with 18 electoral votes for the presidential elections in 2012, 2016, and 2020. The number of electoral votes was down from 20 in the 2004 and 2008 elections, and down from a peak of 26 in 1964 and 1968. As of 2020, Ohio has its fewest electoral votes since 1828, when it cast 16. The state cast 3.71 percent of all electoral votes from 2004 through 2020, the smallest percentage since it cast 3.40 percent of the votes in 1820.

Ohio's large population has long made the state a major influence in politics. Seven presidents have been from Ohio, all Republicans: Ulysses S. Grant, Rutherford B. Hayes, James A. Garfield, Benjamin Harrison, William McKinley, William Howard Taft and Warren G. Harding.

Parties

As of September 19, 2019, there were two recognized political parties in Ohio.

There are also two deregistered parties that have active executive committees.

Ohio's Federal Representation

Following each decennial census, the General Assembly, with the approval of the governor, draws the U.S. congressional district lines for Ohio's 15 seats in the United States House of Representatives. The Ohio Apportionment Board draws state legislative district lines. Ohio currently has 15 House districts In the 118th Congress, 5 of Ohio's seats are held by Democrats and 10 are held by Republicans. There are as follows:

Ohio's 1st congressional district represented by Greg Landsman (D)
Ohio's 2nd congressional district represented by Brad Wenstrup (R)
Ohio's 3rd congressional district represented by Joyce Beatty (D)
Ohio's 4th congressional district represented by Jim Jordan (R)
Ohio's 5th congressional district represented by Bob Latta (R)
Ohio's 6th congressional district represented by Bill Johnson (R)
Ohio's 7th congressional district represented by Max Miller (R)
Ohio's 8th congressional district represented by Warren Davidson (R)
Ohio's 9th congressional district represented by Marcy Kaptur (D)
Ohio's 10th congressional district represented by Mike Turner (R)
Ohio's 11th congressional district represented by Shontel Brown (D)
Ohio's 12th congressional district represented by Troy Balderson (R)
Ohio's 13th congressional district represented by Emilia Sykes (D)
Ohio's 14th congressional district represented by Dave Joyce (R)
Ohio's 15th congressional district represented by Mike Carey (R)

Ohio's two United States Senators are Democrat Sherrod Brown and Republican J. D. Vance, serving since 2007 and 2023, respectively. 

Ohio is part of the United States District Court for the Northern District of Ohio and the United States District Court for the Southern District of Ohio in the federal judiciary. The district's cases are appealed to the Cincinnati-based United States Court of Appeals for the Sixth Circuit.

See also
Government of Ohio
Elections in Ohio
Political Party Strength in Ohio
Ohio Democratic Party
Ohio Republican Party
Libertarian Party of Ohio
Charter Party of Cincinnati, Ohio
Green Party of Ohio

References

External links

 
Government of Ohio